A Fox's Tale is a 2008 Hungarian/British animated film. The film's original Hungarian title is Kis Vuk. It is the sequel to the 1981 film The Little Fox. The English-language voice cast includes Freddie Highmore, Miranda Richardson, Bill Nighy and Sienna Miller.

It was theatrically released in Hungary on April 17, 2008 and in the United States in late 2009.

For ten years, the English dub of the film was never officially released to the general public as it was unavailable, with the only publicly released media to feature the English dub being the international trailer. Until it was uploaded on YouTube on March 9, 2017 by its director György Gát particularly due to the mass popularity of one of its actresses Sienna Miller had following her critically acclaimed roles in Foxcatcher, American Sniper and High-Rise.

Plot 
The animated film is about Little Jack (Freddie Highmore), a young fox who spends his time enjoying a wonderful life in the forest with his loving family. During the film, Little Jack's world changes drastically when his father, Jack, is captured and forced to join the circus. The film's villain, a shrewd circus owner named Anna Conda (Miranda Richardson), desperately wants bigger and better performances. This leads her to kidnap many forest animals, including Little Jack's father. With the help of her magician husband, The Ringmaster (Bill Nighy), Anna is able to hypnotize the animals into performing in her shows.

On his rescue mission, Little Jack gets help from many unlikely heroes, including a incapcitated nature-loving boy named Alex (Matthew McNulty) and a young acrobat named Arabella. Little Jack's mission to rescue his father leads him to make new friends, including a circus fox named Darcey (Sienna Miller). Together, they set out to free the animals so they can return home to the beautiful forest.

Cast 
Freddie Highmore as Little Jack
Miranda Richardson as Anna Conda
Bill Nighy as the Ringmaster 
Sienna Miller as Darcey
Clemency Burton-Hill as Annabella
Matthew McNulty as Alex
Phil Davis as Jack
Andrea Grant as Caw Caw
Rupert Degas as Rufus, Ché, Dizzy
David Holt as Doofus, Knuckles
Jimmy Hibbert as Toby, Buster
Brian Bowles as Stubbs, Forest Ranger
Timothy Bentinck as Papa Rabbit, Igor, Tibs, Colonel
Eve Karpf as Trixie, Madame Renard, Doris
Sean Barrett as Doctor Stan
Olivia Chambelain as Tuffy Rabbit, Carla Renard
Leopold Benedict as Patch Rabbit, Little Timmy

Reception
The film became controversial for the extremely negative criticism from its Hungarian audience, which was mainly disappointed by the film's failure to capture the style and spirit of the original 1981 film.

References

External links
 Kisvuk 
 
 

2008 films
Hungarian animated films
Hungarian-language films
Animated films about foxes
2008 multilingual films
Hungarian multilingual films
British multilingual films

2008 animated films